Stadttheater Pforzheim  is a theatre in Baden-Württemberg, Germany. It is home to the city of Pforzheim's ballet, theatre, and opera companies, as well as the Badische Philharmonie Pforzheim orchestra.

Theatres in Baden-Württemberg